The Iola Formation is a geologic formation in Illinois and Oklahoma. It preserves fossils dating back to the Carboniferous period.

See also

 List of fossiliferous stratigraphic units in Illinois

References
 

Carboniferous Kansas
Carboniferous Iowa
Carboniferous Illinois
Carboniferous Missouri
Carboniferous geology of Oklahoma
Carboniferous southern paleotropical deposits